Glasgow Cathcart can refer to 
 Glasgow Cathcart (UK Parliament constituency) 
 Glasgow Cathcart (Scottish Parliament constituency)